My Sister Sam is an American television sitcom starring Pam Dawber and Rebecca Schaeffer that aired on CBS from October 6, 1986, to April 12, 1988.

Synopsis
The sitcom follows the lives of a 29-year-old San Francisco freelance photographer named Samantha "Sam" Russell (Pam Dawber) and her 16-year-old sister Patti (Rebecca Schaeffer). Sam's life is turned upside down when Patti, who has been living with the sisters' Aunt Elsie and Uncle Bob in rural Oregon after the death of the girls' parents, shows up on Sam's door step and announces that she is going to live with Sam.

The supporting cast includes Sam's neurotic agent Jordan Dylan "J.D." Lucas (Joel Brooks), Sam's sarcastic assistant Dixie Randazzo (Jenny O'Hara) and Jack Kincaid (David Naughton), Sam's womanizing photojournalist neighbor who frequently stops by Sam's apartment.

Cast
Pam Dawber as Samantha "Sam" Russell
Rebecca Schaeffer as Patricia "Patti" Russell
Joel Brooks as Jordan Dylan "J.D." Lucas
Jenny O'Hara as Dixie Randazzo
David Naughton as Jack Kincaid

Production
The series was created by Stephen Fischer and was developed by Pam Dawber's production company, Pony Productions (in association with Warner Bros. Television). Dawber and her Manager, Mimi Weber, spent three years searching for the most ideal television series project for their company to co-produce, but after screening several of them, Dawber had not found one that truly spoke to her. In the midst of this search, she and Weber produced a few TV movies under the Pony Productions nameplate, in which Dawber played lead roles.

By late 1985, Stephen Fischer and Diane English submitted their screenplay to Dawber and Weber, one centering on the life and times of a young photographer on the fast track who takes in her teenage sister, titled Taking the Town (based on the phrase "taking the town by storm"). At last, Dawber found a fulfilling script, and the creative team (she, Weber, Fischer and English) had the pilot successfully pitched to CBS. The network gave it a berth on its successful Monday night sitcom lineup for its 1986-87 fall schedule, originally as Taking the Town, with the title changing to My Sister Sam as summer pre-promotions ramped up.

The series was initially intended to be a starring vehicle for Dawber, who found success on television opposite Robin Williams in the ABC sitcom Mork & Mindy. Dawber later said that she wanted the focus of the show to be on the cast as a whole, stating, "I am not a comedian. I'm a reactor to all the zany people who revolve around me."

My Sister Sam was executive produced by Diane English and Mimi Weber and filmed at The Burbank Studio.

Theme song
The series' theme song, "Room Enough for Two", was written by Steve Dorff and John Bettis and performed by Kim Carnes. Dorff won a BMI TV Music Award in 1987 for his work on the series.

Episodes

Season 1 (1986–87)

Season 2 (1987–88)

Release 
My Sister Sam premiered on October 6, 1986, scheduled between Kate & Allie and Newhart, both hit shows for CBS. The series earned solid ratings and was ranked #21 by the end of its first season. Due to its success, CBS renewed the series for a second season. CBS then moved My Sister Sam to Saturday nights opposite The Facts of Life, which was a part of NBC's successful Saturday night comedy lineup. By the end of October 1987, the show's audience had dwindled to one of the lowest on network TV ranking at #71. The series was put on hiatus in November 1987 but remained in production while the network decided its fate.

CBS brought the series back to the air on March 15, 1988, due in part to letters from fans and the
1988 Writers Guild of America strike which affected the production of other television series for CBS and the other two major television networks (NBC, ABC). CBS chose to move My Sister Sam yet again to Tuesday nights. By April, ratings had failed to improve and the series was again pulled from the lineup. CBS announced the series' cancellation in May 1988, leaving 12 episodes of the second season unaired.

Syndication 
After the series was canceled by CBS, the USA Network picked up syndication rights and eventually aired all 44 episodes, including those never shown on CBS.

Home media 
The show's pilot episode appeared on the bonus disc Warner Bros. 50 Years of TV Commemorative: Volume 2. It was packaged with some releases of Murphy Brown Season 1 DVD set

Reception

Awards and nominations

Rebecca Schaeffer's death
On July 18, 1989, more than a year after My Sister Sam had been canceled, series cast member Rebecca Schaeffer was fatally shot in the doorway of her Los Angeles apartment building by Robert John Bardo, an obsessed fan from Tucson, Arizona who had been stalking her for three years. In August 1989, Pam Dawber, Joel Brooks, David Naughton and Jenny O'Hara reunited to film a public service announcement for the Center to Prevent Handgun Violence in Schaeffer's honor.

References

External links 

1980s American sitcoms
1986 American television series debuts
1988 American television series endings
CBS original programming
English-language television shows
Television series about sisters
Television series by Warner Bros. Television Studios
Television shows set in San Francisco